was a politician and cabinet minister in the late Meiji and Taishō period Empire of Japan.

Biography
Okazaki was born as the younger son in a samurai class family in Wakayama Domain, what is now Wakayama Prefecture. His father was a karō with revenues of 400 koku as a direct retainer of the Kiishū Tokugawa family, and he was the first cousin of Mutsu Munemitsu.

After the Meiji Restoration, at the invitation of Mutsu Munemitsu, Okazaki left Wakayama for Tokyo in 1873. When Mutsu was appointed as ambassador to the United States, Okazaki accompanied him as his secretary and enrolled in the University of Michigan, where he became acquainted with Minakata Kumagusu. Okazaki returned to Japan in 1890, and was elected to the lower house of the Diet of Japan in the 1890 Japanese general election. It marked the start of his political career, and he was subsequently to be reelected to the House of Representatives for ten consecutive times. In 1897, he became a member of the Liberal Party of Japan (Jiyūtō). After Mutsu’s death, he became associated with another of Mutsu’s protégés, Hoshi Toru, and supported the overthrow of the Ōkuma Shigenobu administration, and the formation of the Rikken Seiyūkai party.

In 1900, Okazaki was chosen to become Minister of Communications in the 4th Itō Hirobumi cabinet. For the next twenty years, he continued to play an active, behind-the-scenes role in Japanese party politics, reemerging into the spotlight as Minister of Agriculture and Commerce under the Katō Takaaki administration in 1925. In 1928, he was appointed to the House of Peers.

References

 Ozaki, Yukio. (2001). The Autobiography of Ozaki Yukio: The Struggle for Constitutional Government in Japan. [Translated by Fujiko Hara]. Princeton University Press.

External links

1854 births
1936 deaths
People from Wakayama Prefecture
People of Meiji-period Japan
University of Michigan alumni
Liberal Party (Japan, 1881) politicians
Rikken Seiyūkai politicians
20th-century Japanese politicians
Government ministers of Japan
Members of the House of Peers (Japan)